Walk a Tightrope is a 1964 Anglo-American crime film directed by Frank Nesbitt, written by Neil McCallum, and starring Dan Duryea, Patricia Owens, Terence Cooper, Richard Leech, Neil McCallum and Trevor Reid. It was released on February 12, 1965, by Paramount Pictures.

Plot
An American living in Britain claims he was hired by a woman to kill her husband whom she clearly loves, but all is not what it seems.

Cast       
Dan Duryea as Carl Lutcher
Patricia Owens as Ellen Sheppard
Terence Cooper as Jason Sheppard
Richard Leech as Doug Randle
Neil McCallum as Counsel
Trevor Reid as Inspector MacMitchell
A. J. Brown as Magistrate
David Bauer as Ed
Shirley Cameron as Maisie

References

External links
 

1964 films
American crime films
1964 crime films
Paramount Pictures films
1960s English-language films
1960s American films
English-language crime films